Turning Point is the second studio album by American country music artist Chuck Wicks. It was released on February 26, 2016 via Blaster Records. It includes the singles "Salt Life", "Us Again", "Saturday Afternoon", "I Don't Do Lonely Well" (which was previously recorded by Jason Aldean on his 2012 album, Night Train) and "She's Gone".

Track listing

Chart performance
The album debuted at No. 12 on the Top Country Albums chart, selling 3,700 copies in its first week.

Singles

References 

2016 albums
Chuck Wicks albums